The Forgotten is a 2004 American science fiction psychological thriller film directed by Joseph Ruben and starring Julianne Moore, Dominic West, Gary Sinise, Alfre Woodard, Linus Roache, and Anthony Edwards. The film's plot revolves around a woman who believes that she lost her son in a plane crash 14 months earlier, only to wake up one morning and be told that she never had a son. All of her memories are intact, but with no physical evidence that contradicts the claims of her husband and her psychiatrist, and she sets out in search for solid evidence of her son's existence.

The Forgotten was produced by Revolution Studios for Columbia Pictures and was released in the United States and Canada on September 24, 2004.

Plot

Telly Paretta grieves the loss of her son Sam, who died 14 months prior in a plane crash. She holds regular vigils in his undisturbed bedroom, visits his grave, and meets with a support group for parents who lost their children to accidents, though her husband, Jim, wants to move on. 

Returning from work one afternoon, Telly finds Sam's room completely empty of his things and redecorated with new furniture. Furious, she confronts Jim for trying to forget, but her husband shocks her with a counter accusation: That she is, in actuality, delusional and that they have never had a son.

Hurt, Telly begins reaching out to acquaintances to confirm Sam's existence; however, her friend Eliot doesn't appear to believe in Sam's existence despite her closeness to him. Looking for concrete evidence, she visits Dr. Munce, her OB/GYN; he confirms that she was pregnant, but that she miscarried and "Sam" is her delusional fantasy about how her life would have been different if he had lived. He recommends that she be sent to a hospital, but she runs away.

Fleeing and still adamant that Sam is real, she locates Ash, a member of the support group, whose daughter Lauren was Sam's friend and died in the same crash. However, he also dismisses her and claims he never had a daughter, and calls the police. Shaken by Telly's certainty, he explores his house, discovering Lauren's old room covered up by new paint and wallpaper; in a rush, he remembers his daughter and losing her. 

Chasing after Telly, he rescues her from the police and they go into hiding, pursued by NSA agents. On the run, they speculate about who would have the power, resources, and motive to want to make them forget about their children.

Telly and Ash capture and threaten a pursuing agent, who reluctantly reveals that he and other agents are merely helping ″them″ in order to protect humankind. Without warning, the roof of the house blows off and the agent, along with the roof, is sucked into the sky—presumably taken by "them"—and Telly and Ash flee. 

Eventually, Telly visits Dr. Munce again and he reveals that the disappearances are the work of "them", and that the government monitors their trials, all too aware that they have no power to stop "them" from doing whatever they want.

Munce takes Telly to an airport and the dilapidated hangar of Quest Airlines, where he introduces her to an agent of "them". He tells the agent that it's over and to stop the experiment, because it will only cause more harm. But the agent replies that it's not over. He reveals to Telly that she has been a part of an experiment to test whether the bonds between mother and child can be diminished. In her case, her memories could not be fully erased. 

Telly refuses to deny her son's existence. The agent mentions that if he fails to erase her memory then he will look like a failure. The agent then subdues her and convinces her to think of the first memory she had of Sam. Telly thinks of the day he was born in the hospital, which allows the agent to successfully erase Sam's memory from existence. 

As the agent is walking away thinking he has succeeded, Telly's motherly bond kicks in deeper to the time she was pregnant with Sam, triggering her memory that she indeed had life in her at one time. All of her memories of Sam return. Before the agent can comprehend what's happening, part of the hangar roof is suddenly blown off, and he's yanked into the sky himself for his failure to erase her memory. This ends the experiment.

Telly finds herself living a normal life, with memories of everything that has happened. She reunites with Sam at a park. Also at the park is Ash, watching over his daughter. Like Sam, he has no memory of what has happened. Telly reintroduces herself, and the two sit and watch the kids play in the playground.

Cast

Production
Revolution Studios purchased the script in 2001 and lobbied for Nicole Kidman to play the lead role. Julianne Moore was cast in 2003, and the rest of the cast was announced shortly before filming began.

Filming
Principal photography mostly took place in New York City, beginning on October 25, 2003.

Release
The film was released theatrically on September 24, 2004.

Basic cable
When the film was aired on basic cable the accident was changed, with all mentions of "plane" and "airport" dubbed to "bus" and "terminal".

Reception

Box office 
The film opened September 24, 2004 in the United States and Canada and grossed $21 million in 3,104 theaters its opening weekend, ranking #1 at the box office

The film cost $42 million to produce and it eventually grossed $67.1 million in the U.S. and Canada and $50.4 million in other territories, for a worldwide gross of $117.5 million.

Critical reception
Critics gave the film generally negative reviews. On the review aggregator Rotten Tomatoes, 31% of critics gave the film positive reviews, based on 172 reviews with an average rating of 5/10. The website's critical consensus states that "The premise grows too ridiculous to take seriously". On Metacritic, the film had an average score of 43 out of 100, based on 34 reviews, indicating "mixed or average reviews". Roger Ebert gave the film 2 stars out of 4 stating, "The Forgotten is not a good movie, but at least it supplies a credible victim."

See also
 List of American films of 2004

References

External links
 Official site
 
 
 
 
 

2004 films
2000s mystery thriller films
2004 psychological thriller films
2004 science fiction films
Alien abduction films
American supernatural thriller films
Films directed by Joseph Ruben
Revolution Studios films
Columbia Pictures films
Films about missing people
Films scored by James Horner
American mystery thriller films
Films produced by Joe Roth
Films about altered memories
2000s supernatural thriller films
2000s English-language films
Films produced by Bruce Cohen
2000s American films